Lovono (Vano, Alavano, Alavana) is a nearly extinct language of the island of Vanikoro in the easternmost province of the Solomon Islands. As of 2012, it is only spoken by four speakers; it has been replaced by the island’s dominant language, Teanu.

Name

The language name makes reference to an ancient village in the northwest of the island Banie. In the language Lovono, which was once the dominant one in that area, the village was called Alavana. In Teanu, which is now the only language spoken by the modern population, the same village is called Lovono. This language shift is reflected in the people’s preference to use the Teanu form (i.e. Lovono) both for the village name and for the ancient language that used to be associated with it.

The same village – and hence the language – has been also spelled Whanou or Vano in the scientific literature, possibly reflecting an older pronunciation of the word.

The language

Notes

References

 —— (2021). Online Teanu–English dictionary, with lexical data in Lovono and Tanema. Paris, CNRS.

External links

Audio recordings in the Lovono language, in open access, by A. François (source: Pangloss Collection of CNRS).

Languages of the Solomon Islands
Temotu languages
Endangered Austronesian languages
Critically endangered languages